Graeci may refer to: 
the Latin name of the Ancient Greeks
the Modern Latin name of the (modern) Greeks
the tribe of the Graecians, one of the Boeotian tribes which established colonies in southern Italy

See also
Names of the Greeks
Graia
Graecus